Anisomorpha ferruginea is a species in the family Pseudophasmatidae ("striped walkingsticks"), in the order Phasmatodea ("walkingsticks"). Common names include "northern two-striped walkingstick", "dark walkingstick", and "prairie alligator".
Anisomorpha ferruginea is found in North America.

References

Further reading
 
 Otte, Daniel, and Paul Brock (2003). Phasmida Species File: A Catalog of the Stick and Leaf Insects of the World, 505.

External links
NCBI Taxonomy Browser, Anisomorpha ferruginea

Phasmatodea
Insects described in 1805